William Riggin Travers (July 1819 – March 19, 1887) was an American lawyer who was highly successful on Wall Street.  A well-known cosmopolite, Travers was a member of 27 private clubs, according to Cleveland Amory in his book Who Killed Society?

Early life
Travers was born in 1819 and graduated in 1838 from Columbia College, where he was a member of the Philolexian Society.

Career
John Morrissey in 1863 enlisted Travers' help along with John Hunter's to found Saratoga Race Course where Travers served as the first president. Saratoga's Travers Stakes is named in his honor and is the oldest major Thoroughbred horse race in the United States. In 1884, William Travers became one of the backers of the Sheepshead Bay Race Track on Coney Island.

Travers was a partner in Annieswood Stable with John Hunter and  George Osgood. The operation had considerable success both in racing runners and with breeding at their Annieswood Stud farm in Westchester County, New York. Their horse, the Hall of Famer Kentucky won the first running of the Travers Stakes in 1864. One of their most famous horses was Alarm, considered one of the best sprint race horses in American Thoroughbred horse racing history.

Travers was a long-time president of the New York Athletic Club. On January 13, 1887, the club purchased Hogg Island in Long Island Sound and Pelham, New York, shoreline from the estate of John Hunter and renamed it Travers Island in his honor.

Personal life
He married Maria Louisa Johnson (1827–1893), the fourth daughter of Reverdy Johnson (1796–1876). They had nine children, including:

 William R. Travers, Jr.
 Reverdy J. Travers
 Mary Mackall Travers (1847–1900), who married Henry Winthrop Gray (1839–1906) in 1865. They divorced and she remarried to John Gerard Heckscher (1837–1908).
 Maria Louisa Travers (1848–1931), who married U.S. Representative James Wolcott Wadsworth (1846–1926)
 Harriet Travers (d. 1931), who married George Richmond Fearing (1839–1920)
 Ellen T. Travers (1850–1902), who married William Alexander Duer (1848–1905), son of Willam Duer
 John Travers (1851–1888)
 Matilda E. Travers (d. 1943), who married Walter Gay (1856–1937), the painter, and moved to Paris, France, in 1876 where she remained until her death in 1943.
 Susan B. Travers

Travers died in Bermuda on March 19, 1887, from complications of diabetes. In his obituary, The New York Times wrote that he was "probably the most popular man in New York."

References

Further reading
 New York Times obituary
 Alarm at Thoroughbred Heritage.com
 Matilda Travers Gay information published by the Association of Historians of Nineteenth-Century Art
 William R. Travers information at the History of the Town of Pelham, New York

1819 births
1887 deaths
American financiers
American racehorse owners and breeders
American horse racing industry executives
Lawyers from Baltimore
Saratoga Race Course
Deaths from diabetes
Columbia College (New York) alumni
19th-century American lawyers
19th-century American businesspeople
Presidents of the New York Athletic Club